Napo Davis Matsoso is a Mosotho footballer who currently plays as a midfielder for Oakland Roots and the Lesotho national team. Besides Lesotho, he has played in the United States.

Matsoso was drafted 31st overall by the New England Revolution in the second round of the 2017 MLS SuperDraft.

Honors

Club
Louisville City FC
USL Cup (1): 2018

References

External links

1994 births
Living people
People from Maseru
Association football midfielders
Lesotho footballers
Lesotho expatriate footballers
Lesotho international footballers
Kentucky Wildcats men's soccer players
Derby City Rovers players
New England Revolution draft picks
Expatriate soccer players in the United States
Soccer players from Louisville, Kentucky
Mississippi Brilla players
Louisville City FC players
Oakland Roots SC players